Krzysztof Sosna (born 11 October 1969) is a Polish biathlete. He competed in the men's 20 km individual event at the 1992 Winter Olympics.

References

1969 births
Living people
Polish male biathletes
Olympic biathletes of Poland
Biathletes at the 1992 Winter Olympics
People from Wodzisław Śląski